Talpa is a 1956 Mexican drama film directed by Alfredo B. Crevenna. It was entered into the 1956 Cannes Film Festival.

Cast
 Lilia Prado - Juana
 Leonor Llausás - La presumida
 Víctor Manuel Mendoza - Tanilo
 Jaime Fernández - Esteban
 Hortensia Santoveña - La mère
 José Chávez
 Blanca Estela Limón
 Alicia Montoya
 José Muñoz
 Aurora Walker
 Amado Zumaya

References

External links

1956 films
Mexican drama films
1950s Spanish-language films
1956 drama films
Films directed by Alfredo B. Crevenna
1950s Mexican films